Dominique Muller, real name  Dominique Muller-Wakhevitch, (9 August 1949, Strasbourg) is a French journalist and novelist, author of several historical mysteries.

Biography 
She took part to the  radiko program on France Culture. In 1993 she won the Prix Roger Nimier for C'était le paradis and the Prix du jury Jean-Giono For her autobiographical narration Les Caresses et les Baisers (1998). Les Malgré-nous (2003), which recounts the first Nazi raids in Alsace during the Second World War, obtained a great public success. In "Désormais Venise" (2005), Dominique Muller evokes her passionate love affairs with Maurice Rheims.

In 1999, she launched into the historical detective novel genre with a series whose hero is the doctor Florent Bonnevy, nicknamed Sauve-du-Mal, whose investigations take place under the Régence of Philippe, duc d'Orléans. A rationalist and follower of the ideas advocated by the Encyclopédistes, doctor Florent leaves his native Holland to settle in France. Having become a familiar of the Régent, who does not always trust him, he must hide his Jewish origins from his wife Justine. In Sauve-du-Mal et les tricheurs (1999), he investigates the past of a friend of Justine found dead in a maison close. In Le Culte des dupes (2000), he is the target of a sect worshiping the Egyptian gods who, under this cover, is trafficking young girls in a convent. Very well documented, the series Sauve-du-Mal observes a style in the manner of the writers of the eighteenth century.

In 1989, she was awarded the Prix Mottard of the Académie française for her novel Danger public.

Muller lives in Venice and Paris and now signs her works Dominique Muller-Wakhevitch.

Work

novels

Detective series Sauve-du-Mal 
1999: Sauve-du-Mal et les tricheurs, Paris, series "", ,.
1999: Le Culte des dupes, 10/18, 1999, series "Grands Détectives", .
2000: Trop de cabales pour Sauve-du-Mal, 10/18, series "Grands Détectives", .
2001: Sauve-du-Mal et l'appât du grain, 10/18, series "Grands Détectives", .
2001: Sauve-du-Mal dans l'ombre du tsar, 10/18, series "Grands Détectives", .

Other novels 
1986: Brave Petite, Paris, Le Seuil, .
1988: Danger public, Le Seuil, Prix Mottard of the Académie française
1993: C'était le paradis, Le Seuil, Prix Roger-Nimier.
1995: Le Meilleur de la vie, Fayard, .
2000: Les Filles prodigues, Le Seuil, .
2001: Les Chapeaux de roues, Le Seuil, .
2003: Les Malgré-nous, Le Seuil, .
2006: Aimer sans bagages, Le Seuil, .
2008: Lire la notice et vivre ensuite, Stock, .
2010: Laguna nostra, Robert Laffont, .

Autobiographical stories 
1998: Les Caresses et les Baisers, Paris, Le Seuil, .
2005: Désormais Venise, Paris, Le Seuil, .

Biographies 
1990: Une traînée de poudre: Jeanne Du Barry, la dernière favorite, Paris, JC Lattès.
1996: Une reine pas très catholique, biographie d'Anne Boleyn, Paris, NiL Éditions,

Essay 
1998: Demander la lune, Paris, Nil; reprint, Paris, Le Seuil, 1999, series "Points", .

Notes

Bibliography 
 .

External links 
 Dominique Muller on France Culture
 Dominique Muller on the site of the Académie française
 Dominique Muller on Who's who in France

20th-century French novelists
21st-century French novelists
20th-century French journalists
21st-century French journalists
French crime fiction writers
Roger Nimier Prize winners
1949 births
Writers from Strasbourg
Living people
21st-century French women writers
20th-century French women writers